Strontium oxide or strontia, SrO, is formed when strontium reacts with oxygen. Burning strontium in air results in a mixture of strontium oxide and strontium nitride. It also forms from the decomposition of strontium carbonate SrCO3. It is a strongly basic oxide.

Uses
About 8% by weight of cathode ray tubes is strontium oxide, which has been the major use of strontium since 1970. Color televisions and other devices containing color cathode ray tubes sold in the United States are required by law to use strontium in the faceplate to block X-ray emission (these X-ray emitting TVs are no longer in production). Lead(II) oxide can be used in the neck and funnel, but causes discoloration when used in the faceplate.

Reactions
Elemental strontium is formed when strontium oxide is heated with aluminium in a vacuum.

References

External links
Hansen, Tony, "SrO (Strontium Oxide, Strontia)", ceramic-materials.com

Strontium compounds
Oxides
Rock salt crystal structure